The Newspaper Research Journal  is a quarterly, peer-reviewed academic journal that publishes original social scientific (including newspaper management and media economics), historical and legal articles about all aspects of the global newspaper industry, including journalism. The editor-in-chief is Dane S. Claussen (Editor-in-Chief and Executive Director, Nonprofit Sector News). The journal is published by the Newspaper and Online News Division of the Association for Education in Journalism and Mass Communication in association with SAGE Publications.

Editors of the journal have been Gerald C. Stone (1979-88), Ralph Izard (1989-2000), Elinor Kelly Grusin and Sandra H. Utt (2001-17), and Dane S. Claussen (since 2017).

Abstracting and indexing
Newspaper Research Journal  is abstracted and indexed in EBSCO databases and ProQuest databases.

External links

SAGE Publishing academic journals
English-language journals
Media studies journals
Quarterly journals
Publications established in 1979